Subgenera of genus Betula (birch), are;

Subgenus Betulenta - Wintergreen oil birches
Bark on twigs rich in methyl salicylate (oil of wintergreen). Female catkins erect.
Diploid (2n = 28).
Betula lenta - Sweet birch or cherry birch
Betula lenta subsp. uber - Cherry Creek birch
Hexaploid (6n = 84).
Betula allegheniensis - Yellow birch (B. lutea)
Decaploid (10n = 140).
Betula austrosinensis - South China birch
Betula globispica - 
Betula insignis - 
Betula medwediewii - Caucasian birch
Duodecaploid (12n = 168).
Betula megrelica - 
chromosome number not reported
Betula corylifolia - Hazel-leaf birch
Betula grossa - Japanese cherry birch
Betula insignis -

Subgenus Betulaster - Large-leaf birches
Bark on twigs contains some methyl salicylate. Female catkins pendulous.
Betula alnoides - Alder-leaf birch
Betula alnoides subsp. luminifera - 
Betula maximowicziana - Monarch birch

Subgenus Neurobetula - Costate birches
Bark on twigs without methyl salicylate. Female catkins erect.
Diploid (2n = 28).
Betula calcicola -
Betula chichibuensis - 
Betula costata - Korean birch
Betula nigra - River birch or black birch
Betula potaninii - Potanin's birch
Tetraploid (4n = 56).
Betula albosinensis - Chinese red birch
Betula albosinensis var. septentrionalis - North Chinese red birch
Betula ermanii - Erman's birch
Betula jacquemontii (B. utilis subsp. jacquemontii) - White-barked Himalayan birch
Betula utilis - Himalayan birch
Hexaploid (6n = 84).
Betula dahurica - Dahurian birch
Betula delavayi - Delavay's birch
Betula raddeana - Radde's birch
Octoploid (8n = 112).
Betula chinensis - Chinese birch
chromosome number not reported
Betula fargesii - Farges's birch
Betula schmidtii - Schmidt's birch
chromosome number unknown
Betula leopoldae

Subgenus Betula - Typical birches
Bark on twigs without methyl salicylate. Female catkins pendulous.
Diploid (2n = 28).
Betula cordifolia - Heart-leaf birch or mountain paper birch
Betula pendula - Silver birch
Betula mandschurica - Manchurian birch
Betula mandschurica var. japonica - Japanese birch
Betula neoalaskana - Alaska birch or Yukon birch
Betula occidentalis - Water birch or red birch (B. fontinalis)
Betula platyphylla (Betula pendula var. platyphylla) - Siberian silver birch
Betula populifolia - Gray birch
Betula szechuanica (Betula pendula var. szechuanica) - Sichuan birch
Tetraploid (4n = 56).
Betula celtiberica - Iberian white birch
Betula pubescens - White birch, European white birch or downy birch
Betula pubescens subsp. tortuosa - Arctic white birch
Pentaploid (5n = 70).
Betula kenaica - Kenai birch
Hexaploid (6n = 84).
Betula papyrifera - Paper birch, canoe birch or American white birch (sometimes tetraploid or pentaploid)

Subgenus Chamaebetula - Dwarf birches
Small shrubs with small rounded leaves. Female catkins pendulous.
Diploid (2n = 28).
Betula glandulosa (B. nana subsp. glandulosa) - American dwarf birch
Betula nana - Dwarf birch
Tetraploid (4n = 56).
Betula minor - Quebec dwarf birch
Betula pumila - Swamp birch
chromosome number not reported
Betula fruticosa - 
Betula gmelinii - 
Betula hallii - Cascades dwarf birch
Betula humilis - Arctic dwarf birch
Betula michauxii - Newfoundland dwarf birch
Betula microphylla - 
Betula middendorffii -

Notes
There is no consensus at all on species limits in Betula, with different authors differing wildly in what species they accept, from under 30 species, to over 60. The above (incomplete) list was compiled from the references cited below. Birches will hybridise very freely, particularly in cultivation but also in the wild where conditions and species present permit. While differing chromosome number (diploid, tetraploid, etc.) may reduce interbreeding, it is not an absolute bar to it. Many botanists regard differing chromosome number as a specific discriminant, though not all do so (e.g. some include B. cordifolia and B. neoalaskana as varieties within B. papyrifera).

References

Bean, W. J. 1976, 1988. Trees & Shrubs hardy in the British Isles. Eighth edition, revised, vol. 1 (1976) & Supplement (1988); editor D. L. Clarke.
Hunt, D. 1993. Betula. Proceedings of the IDS Betula Symposium 2-4 October 1992. International Dendrology Society.

Rushforth, K. D. 1999. Trees of Britain & Europe. Collins. (Useful details on chromosome numbers of many European & Asian birches).
Skvortsov, A. K. 2002. A new system of the genus Betula. Byulleten Moskovoskogo Obshchestva Ispytatelei Prirody Otdel Biologie 107: 73–76.
Flora of North America online - Betula.
Grimshaw, J.  2009, New Trees, Recent introductions to cultivation. Kew Publishing

See also
 Birch

Betula
Betula